Airest (AS Airest) is an Estonian-owned airline that started in January 2002, operating regular cargo and charter passenger flights.

Company 

Airest (Airest Inc) is an Estonian private aviation company engaged in commercial cargo air transportation in accordance with EU-OPS Part 1.
With the head office in Tallinn, Airest provides service to cargo partners in Northern Europe.

In early 2012, Estonian Civil Aviation Administration issued a new Air Operator Certificate to Airest Inc. Three-letter designator: AEG; Telephony designator: AIREST CARGO; Sitatex address: XH-TLL-AE (Type B: TLLAEXH).

In late 2012, Airest revealed a new company design, website and bulletin.

On 11 July 2013, AIREST was certified by ECAA as EASA Part 145 maintenance organization. AIREST maintenance organization scope of work is line maintenance on SAAB 340 up to 800FH (included). Tallinn line station started working from 1. of August 2013. In November 2014, Airest opened its 4th line maintenance base in Budapest.

In September 2014, Airest signed an agreement for a 5th SAAB 340a aircraft to be added to the fleet. Registration number ES-LSE with the nickname "Echo" will be enjoying its time flying in Hungary and Romania.

On 15 September 2014, Airest is flying to 14 destinations with 4 line maintenance bases.

Airest's aircraft have been active in Baden-Baden, Billund, Budapest, Cluj-Napoca, Gothenburg, Helsinki, Jönköping, Malmö, Stavanger, Stockholm, Tampere, Tallinn, Timișoara and Turku.

On 31 August 2015, Airest announced the start of a new brand named "FLYEST". FLYEST is a brand for a new passenger airline with a plan to innovate charter and personal flights also offer services for regional and international flights. Flyest's first aircraft SAAB 340 ES-LSF started flying for Estonian Air on a Stockholm – Tallinn – Saint Petersburg route the same day.

On 7 November 2015, in connection with the bankruptcy of Estonian Air, Airest is no longer flying on Stockholm – Tallinn – Petersburg route. Airest was also operating on lines to Oslo and Vilnius. In accordance with the feedback from Estonian Air, the service provided by Airest was precise and satisfying.

On 23 November 2015, a deal was closed for buying two SAAB 340 aircraft. Airest is now operating with 8 SAAB 340 aircraft. New members of the fleet are welcomed with nicknames "Golf" and "Hotel" – both being cargo planes and moving to the Budapest station. From today the Budapest station is the largest of Airest's 4 stations with 4 aircraft.

On 17 December 2015, Airest's SAAB 340 ES-LSF under the brand FLYEST, started flying on Pori – Helsinki route with a one-year contract.

On 9 October 2017, Airest announced the appointment of Aleksei Lupitski as their new CEO. He assumed responsibilities on 2 October succeeding Jaanus Ojamets, who has stepped down for personal reasons. Aleksei Lupitski has vast experience in the airline industry, holding senior management positions at various airlines for the last 20 years. For the past 8 years he was the President & CEO of Lithuanian airline Avion Express. Under Aleksei's management, Avion Express grew from 4 Saab 340 operator to a global wet lease player with a fleet of 16x Airbus A320 family aircraft.

On 9 March 2020, Airest ferried its first Airbus A320 aircraft (ES-LAA) from Mexico City Airport with a stopover at Montréal–Mirabel Airport to Tallinn Airport.

Destinations 
Airest operates scheduled cargo flights to the following destinations:

Denmark

 Billund Airport

Estonia:

 Tallinn Airport

Finland:

 Helsinki Airport

Germany

 Karlsruhe/Baden-Baden Airport

Great Britain

 Birmingham Airport

Hungary

 Budapest Ferenc Liszt International Airport

Moldova

 Chișinǎu International Airport

Norway

 Oslo Airport, Gardemoen
 Stavanger Airport, Sola

Republic of Ireland

 Dublin Airport

Romania

 Bucharest – Henri Coandă International Airport
 Timișoara – Traian Vuia International Airport

Sweden

 Stockholm Arlanda Airport
 Göteborg Landvetter Airport
 Jönköping Airport
 Malmö Airport

Current fleet 
,The Airest fleet consists of the following aircraft:

Past fleet
, the Airest fleet included as per GSA worldwide Nordic European Aviation

References

External links

Airest Inc. Company Profile Bulletin

Airlines of Estonia
Airlines established in 2002
2002 establishments in Estonia
Companies based in Tallinn
Cargo airlines
Cargo airlines of Estonia
Estonian brands